Son of Schmilsson is the eighth album by American singer Harry Nilsson.

Background
Nilsson was being pressured to produce a follow-up album similar to his 1971 breakthrough, Nilsson Schmilsson, but instead, he created a more eccentric work. The album was produced by Richard Perry and features musical contributions from former Beatles Ringo Starr and George Harrison. Other musicians on the recording include Nicky Hopkins, Klaus Voormann, Bobby Keys and Peter Frampton. Among the album's tracks are "You're Breakin' My Heart" and the US hit "Spaceman".

Most of the sessions were extensively filmed, at the request of Nilsson. The footage was to be used for a planned documentary, titled Did Somebody Drop His Mouse?, but the film was never released.

The album cover features a photograph of Nilsson (dressed as a Dracula-like vampire) taken by Michael Putland at George Harrison’s home Friar Park. The album was remastered and released on CD with two bonus tracks in 2000 and with five bonus tracks in 2006.

Track listing
All tracks written by Harry Nilsson except where noted.

Side one (LP)
 "Take 54" – 4:22
 "Remember (Christmas)"– 4:07
 "Joy" – 3:42
 "Turn on Your Radio" – 2:42
 "You're Breakin' My Heart" – 3:10
Side two (LP)
"Spaceman" – 3:33
 "The Lottery Song" – 2:24
 "At My Front Door" (Ewart B. Abner, John C. Moore) – 2:46
 "Ambush" – 5:35
 "I'd Rather Be Dead" (Nilsson, Richard Perry) – 3:20
 "The Most Beautiful World in the World" – 3:33

Bonus tracks (2000 reissue)
<li>"Joy" (demo version: guitar) – 1:57
<li>"Joy" (demo version: piano) – 0:55

Bonus tracks (2006 reissue)
<li>"What's Your Sign?" (Alternate version) – 3:08
<li>"Take 54" (Alternate take) – 3:39
<li>"Campo de Encino" (Jimmy Webb) – 4:54
<li>"Daybreak" (Single version) – 3:06
<li>"It Had to Be You" (Jam session) – 2:34 (Hidden track)

Charts

Personnel
 Harry Nilsson – vocals, electric piano (tracks 1, 5, 6, 9), acoustic guitar (4)
 Nicky Hopkins – piano (tracks 1–8, 11)
 Klaus Voormann – bass guitar (tracks 1, 3–6, 8, 11), saxophone (1, 5), electric guitar (7)
 Ringo Starr (credited as Richie Snare) – drums (tracks 1, 6, 8, 9, 11)
 Peter Frampton – electric guitar (tracks 3–5, 8, 9), acoustic guitar (6, 7)
 Chris Spedding – bouzouki (track 2), electric guitar (8, 9), acoustic guitar (6, 7)
 Milt Holland – percussion (tracks 1, 7)
 Jim Price – trumpet (tracks 1, 5, 9), trombone (9), horn arrangement (9)
 Bobby Keys – saxophone (tracks 1, 5, 8, 9)
 Lowell George – guitar (track 1)
 Del Newman – string arrangements (track 2, 11)
 Pop Arts String Quartet - strings (track 2)
 John Uribe – acoustic guitar (tracks 3, 6, 7), electric guitar (track 9)
 Red Rhodes – pedal steel guitar (track 3)
 Ray Cooper – percussion (tracks 3, 7, 11), congas (8), tambourine (9)
 Kirby Johnson – horn arrangements (tracks 4, 11)
 Richard Mackey – tuben/French horn (track 4)
 Vincent DeRosa – tuben/French horn (track 4)
 David Duke – tuben/French horn (track 4)
 George Harrison (credited as George Harrysong) – slide guitar (track 5)
 Barry Morgan – drums (tracks 3, 5)
 Paul Buckmaster – orchestral arrangement (track 6)
 "Moxie" – bass harmonica (track 6)
 Richard Perry – percussion (tracks 6, 11), arrangements (11)
 Senior Citizens of the Stepney & Pinner Choir Club No. 6, London, England – choir (track 10)
 The Henry Krein Quartet with Klaus Voormann – rhythm section (track 10)
 Henry Krein – accordion (track 10)
 Paul Keogh – guitar (track 11)
 Les Thatcher – guitar (track 11)
Technical
Ken Scott, Robin Geoffrey Cable, Phil McDonald - engineer
Michael Putland - cover photography

Charts
Album

Single

Certifications

References

1972 albums
Harry Nilsson albums
RCA Records albums
Albums produced by Richard Perry
Albums recorded at Trident Studios
Albums recorded at Apple Studios
Albums arranged by Paul Buckmaster